National Golf Academy and Trivandrum Golf Club is a nine-hole golf course located at Thiruvananthapuram city in the Indian state of Kerala.

Area

The course is spread over 25.38 acres. It was started around the 1850s during the days of the late Maharajah Sreemoolam Tirunal. The golf course here is one of the oldest in the country and is more than 150 years old.

References

Sports venues in Thiruvananthapuram
Golf clubs and courses in India
19th-century establishments in India
Sports venues completed in the 19th century